Graham Leslie Smith (born 20 June 1946) is an English former professional footballer who played as a defender. He played in the Football League for Rochdale and Stockport County.

References

External links

Profile at ENFA

1946 births
Living people
English footballers
Sportspeople from Pudsey
Footballers from West Yorkshire
Association football defenders
Leeds United F.C. players
Rochdale A.F.C. players
Stockport County F.C. players
Buxton F.C. players
English Football League players